Arkadaksky District is an administrative and municipal district (raion), one of the thirty-eight in Saratov Oblast, Russia. It is located in the west of the oblast. Its administrative center is the town of Arkadak. Population: 26,236 (2010 Census);  The population of Arkadak accounts for 49.0% of the district's total population.

References

Notes

Sources

Districts of Saratov Oblast